Gipps may refer to:

 Gipps, a surname and list of people by that name
 Mount Gipps, Queensland, Australia
 Mount Gipps Station, New South Wales, Australia
 Mount Gipps railway station, New South Wales, Australia
 Gipps County, New South Wales, Australia
 Gipps Ice Rise, Larsen Ice Shelf, Antarctica

See also

 Gipps' model
 GippsAero, Australian aircraft company
 Electoral district of Gipps' Land, Victoria, Australia
 Electoral district of Sydney-Gipps, New South Wales, Australia
 Old Gippstown, Moe, Victoria, Australia; a museum
 Gipp, a surname
 George Gipps (disambiguation)
 Gippsland (disambiguation)
 Gibbs (disambiguation)
 Gips (disambiguation)